Nóirín is an Irish given name. Notable people with the name include:

Nóirín Ní Riain (born 1951), Irish singer, writer, teacher, and theologian
Nóirín O'Sullivan
Nóirín Kelly, a contestant on Big Brother (British series 10)

Irish-language feminine given names